Margaret Windsor may refer to:

 Princess Margaret of Connaught (1882–1920), daughter of Prince Arthur, Duke of Connaught and granddaughter of Queen Victoria
 Princess Margaret, Countess of Snowdon (1930–2002), daughter of King George VI and sister of Queen Elizabeth II

See also 
 Margaret of Windsor
 Princess Margaret (disambiguation)